"Into the Heat" is a song by Australian hard rock the Angels, released in February 1981 as a non-album single. The song peaked at number 13 on the Kent Music Report.

Track listing 
 EPIC ES 581
 Into the Heat (Doc Neeson, John Brewster, Richard Brewster) - 3:03
 Back On You (Neeson, J. Brewster, R. Brewster) - 3:02

Personnel 
 John Brewster - rhythm guitar, vocals
 Rick Brewster - lead guitar, vocals
 Doc Neeson - lead vocals
 Chris Bailey - bass, vocals
 Graham "Buzz" Bidstrup - drums
Production Team
 John Brewster, Richard Brewster - Producers (tracks: 1 & 2)

Charts

References 

The Angels (Australian band) songs
1981 singles
Epic Records singles
Songs written by Doc Neeson
Songs written by John Brewster (musician)